Jarome Luai (born 16 January 1997) is a  international rugby league footballer who plays as a  for the Penrith Panthers in the NRL (National Rugby League).

He won both the 2021 and the 2022 NRL Grand Finals with the Penrith club. He has represented the NSW Blues in State of Origin, Samoa at test and 9's level and the Māori All Stars at international level.

Background
Luai was born in Sydney, New South Wales, Australia, of Māori (Tainui) and Samoan descent through his paternal grandparents (who are from Palauli)

He played his junior rugby league for the St Marys Saints before being signed by the Penrith Panthers.

Playing career

Early career
Luai played 33 games for the Penrith Panthers in the NYC between 2015 and 2017, scoring 13 tries and kicking 43 goals. 

Luai spent part of the 2017 season playing for Penrith in the New South Wales Cup. Luai captained the Junior Kiwis in May 2017, scoring a try in their 4622 loss to the Junior Kangaroos.

2017
At the 2017 World Cup, Luai was the only member of the Samoan squad without any prior NRL experience. He speculated on his selection, saying "I think you'll find Tyrone May was in the squad originally but due to his injury there was a spot for me." Luai made his Test debut against Tonga on 4 November 2017.

2018
Following an injury to Nathan Cleary, Luai was named to make his NRL debut off the interchange bench in round 4 of the 2018 NRL season. However, he was cut from the line-up on gameday in favour of Wayde Egan, who was also on debut. Luai made his NRL debut in round 10 against the Newcastle Knights, playing for 26 minutes off the interchange bench. His performance in the 364 win, which included two tries and multiple try assists, was heavily praised by the media.

2019
Luai made 13 appearances for Penrith in the 2019 NRL season as the club finished 10th on the table and missed the finals for the first time in four years. Luai also represented Samoa playing hooker in their 24-6 win over PNG. And played halfback in their 44-18 loss to Fiji.

2020
Luai had a breakout year for Penrith playing 23 games, scoring seven tries and bagging 23 try assists as Penrith claimed the Minor Premiership and reached the grand final against the Melbourne Storm, losing 2620. Luai's form throughout the season was rewarded with a spot in the New South Wales State of Origin 27 man squad although he did not play in the three game series.

2021
On 30 May, he was selected by New South Wales for game 1 of the 2021 State of Origin series.
Luai made his debut for New South Wales in game 1 where they defeated Queensland 50-6. On 27 June, Luai was a part of the NSW side which defeated Queensland 26-0, sealing the series for 2021. However, Luai was ruled out of game three of the series after he suffered a knee injury in Penrith's round 16 win over the Parramatta Eels.

Luai played a total of 25 games for Penrith in the 2021 NRL season including the club's grand final victory over South Sydney.

2022
In round 11 of the 2022 NRL season, Luai scored two tries for Penrith in a 32-12 victory over the Sydney Roosters.

Luai played all three State of Origin games as New South Wales lost the series 2-1. During the series, Luai verbally abused an unconscious Selwyn Cobbo, whist standing over him. The move prompted criticism, especially after Luai refused to apologise.

Luai won the 2022 Premiership with Penrith in a 28-12 win over Parramatta in the Grand Final.  Following the grand final victory, Luai once again mocked the Parramatta club through social media posing for a photo with the caption "Daddy loves you".  Luai had previously referred to Penrith as Parramatta's "Daddy" four days out from the match.

On 6 October, Luai mocked Parramatta player Ryan Matterson on social media after Matterson had mentioned Luai had gone unpunished in the grand final for allegedly kicking Isaiah Papali'i whilst Matterson was suspended for three games over a crusher tackle on Dylan Edwards.  Luai posted the words "Cry 4 U" on Instagram accompanied by three crying emojis, and the chorus to R&B star Kennyon Brown’s song "Cry 4 You". Video footage after the game revealed Luai never made contact with Papali'i
 This was followed by an Instagram story posted after the game, which contained a racial slur "nigga". The Panthers' management subsequently stated that the term was used affectionately, which drew further widespread criticism.

In October Luai was named in the Samoa squad for the 2021 Rugby League World Cup.

Luai played every match of the 2021 Rugby League World Cup including the final against Australia in which Samoa were comprehensively beaten 30-10.

In November he was named in the 2021 RLWC Team of the Tournament.

2023
On 18 February, Luai played in Penrith's 13-12 upset loss to St Helens RFC in the 2023 World Club Challenge.

Honours
Club
 2020 Minor Premiership Winners
 2020 NRL Grand Final Runner-up
 2021 NRL Grand Final Winners
 2022 Minor Premiership Winners
 2022 NRL Grand Final Winners

Representative
 2021 State of Origin series Winners

References

External links

Penrith Panthers profile
2017 RLWC profile
Samoa profile

1997 births
Living people
Australian rugby league players
Australian people of New Zealand descent
Australian people of Māori descent
Australian sportspeople of Samoan descent
Samoa national rugby league team players
New Zealand Māori rugby league team players
Penrith Panthers players
New South Wales Rugby League State of Origin players
Junior Kiwis players
Rugby league halfbacks
Rugby league players from Sydney
Sportsmen from New South Wales